Nuits de la Fondation Maeght is a live album by American composer, bandleader and keyboardist Sun Ra recorded in 1970 France and released in two volumes on the Shandar label.

Reception

Allmusic awarded both albums 4½ stars stating "As a rule, free and avant-garde jazz are a decidedly acquired taste. However, for discerning palettes, these installments present the aggregate at their absolute pinnacle in terms of performance and inspiration" and noting the performances cover "a wide variety of styles and approaches, proving that the combo were far more multifaceted and involved than often given credit for".

Track listing
All compositions by Sun Ra except as indicated

Volume 1:
 "Enlightment" (Ra, Hobart Dotson) – 2:56
 "The Star Gazers" – 3:08
 "Shadow World" – 13:20
 "The Cosmic Explorer" – 19:45
Volume 2:
 "Friendly Galaxy Number 2" – 8:46
 "Spontaneous Simplicity" – 10:50
 "The World of the Lightening" – 5:54
 "Black Myth: The Shadows Took Shape/This Strange World/Journey Through the Outer Darkness" – 8:32
 "Sky" – 2:01

Personnel
Sun Ra – electric piano, organ, Minimoog
Kwame Hadi – trumpet
Akh Tal Ebah – cornet, trumpet
John Gilmore – tenor saxophone, drum, vocals
Marshall Allen – alto saxophone, flute, oboe, piccolo, percussion
Pat Patrick – baritone saxophone, tenor saxophone, alto saxophone, clarinet, bass clarinet, flute, percussion
James Jacson – clarinet, oboe, flute
Danny Davis – alto saxophone, flute, percussion
Abshalom Ben Shlomo – alto saxophone, flute, clarinet
Danny Ray Thompson – baritone saxophone, alto saxophone, flute
Alan Silva – violin, cello, bass
Alejandro Blake Fearon – bass
Rashid Salim IV – vibraphone, drums
Nimrod Hunt – hand drums
John Goldsmith – drums, tympani
Lex Humphries – drums, percussion
June Tyson – vocals
Gloristeena Knight – dance, vocals
Verta Grosvenor – space goddess, dance, vocals

References

1971 live albums
Sun Ra live albums
Shandar albums